Clinopodium douglasii, or yerba buena, is a rambling aromatic herb of western and northwestern North America, ranging from maritime Alaska southwards to California. The plant takes the form of a sprawling, mat-forming perennial, and is especially abundant close to the coast.  The name "yerba buena" derives from Spanish for "good herb" and is applied to various other plants. Molecular evidence places the species within the Clinopodium complex rather than Micromeria.

Name 
The plant's most common name, "yerba buena", the same in English and Spanish, is an alternate form of the Spanish hierba buena (meaning "good herb"). The name was bestowed by Catholic missionaries of Alta California after native people introduced them to it. It was so abundant there that its name was also applied to the settler's town adjacent to Mission San Francisco de Asís as well as to the cove along San Francisco Bay upon which it was situated. The prominent island directly in front of the settlement also came to be called Isla Yerba Buena at least as early as 1833, although it is not certain whether it was named for the settlement, the cove or directly for the herb.

In 1846, the town of Yerba Buena was seized by the United States during the Mexican–American War.  Its name was changed in 1847 to San Francisco. As of March 2015, some 270,000 vehicles commuters drive daily through the tunnel on Yerba Buena Island that connects the spans of the San Francisco–Oakland Bay Bridge.

Yerba buena is also used as a common name for other plants with aromatic foliage and in particular, for various old world mints.  The native Clinopodium douglasii has a fragrance similar to spearmint.

References

External links

 USDA Plants database Clinopodium douglasii (Benth.) Kuntze
 Jepson Manual treatment Clinopodium douglasii (Benth.) Kuntze

douglasii
Flora of California
Flora of Oregon
Flora of Washington (state)
Herbs
Herbal tea
Plants described in 1831
Flora of the United States
Flora of Canada
Flora without expected TNC conservation status